Sergeant Win Cho (born 10 August 1974) is a Burmese football referee. He officiates in the Myanmar National League.

Win Cho became a FIFA referee in 2004. He refereed at the 2006 AFC Challenge Cup, 2010 AFF Suzuki Cup, and other international competitions.

References 

1974 births
Living people
Burmese football referees